
Lac des Autannes is a lake above Grimentz in the canton of Valais, Switzerland.

Lakes of Valais
Reservoirs in Switzerland